The 1912 Tour de France started with 131 cyclists; there were 10 teams of 5 cyclists each; these 50 cyclists included all favourites for the overall victory. The remaining 81 cyclists started in the isolés category. The Alcyon team had the pre-race favourite, Gustave Garrigou, the winner of the previous Tour de France. To help him, they hired Odile Defraye, who had performed well at the 1912 Tour of Belgium. At first, the Alcyon team did not want to select Defraye, but the Belgian representative of Alcyon posed commercial threats, and Defraye was selected.

Cyclists

By team

By starting number

By nationality

References

1912 Tour de France
1912